Yarino is the name of several rural localities in Russia:
Yarino (settlement), Dobryanka, Perm Krai, a settlement in Dobryanka, Perm Krai
Yarino (village), Dobryanka, Perm Krai, a village in Dobryanka, Perm Krai